Harold López-Nussa Torres is a Cuban jazz pianist.  He lives in Havana's Vedado neighborhood in Cuba and has French ancestry on his grandmother's side.

López-Nussa gave a concert in the 2006 Montreux Jazz Festival and recorded with Claude Nobs support, "Sobre el Atelier" in a Swiss studio.

Career 
López-Nussa was born into a musical family in Havana on July 13, 1983. His father, Ruy López-Nussa Lekszycki, and his younger brother Ruy Adrián López-Nussa are drummers and percussionist. His uncle Ernán López-Nussa is a well-known jazz pianist. His mother, Mayra Torres, was a piano teacher.

He started on piano when he was eight years old, attending the Manuel Saumell Elementary School of Music and Amadeo Roldán Conservatory. After graduating from the Instituto Superior de Artes, he toured with Omara Portuondo. In 2003, he worked with the 
Cuban National Symphony Orchestra. Two years later, he participated in a piano contest at the Montreux Jazz Festival and won first place. He released his first solo album, Canciones, in 2007. He has worked with Leo Brouwer, Gilles Peterson, and Alune Wade, and he has recorded with his father and brother.

Discography 
 2007: Canciones (Colibrí)
 2007: Sobre el Atelier (Harmonia Mundi)
 2009: Herencia  with Felipe Cabrera, Ruy Adrián López-Nussa (World Village)
 2011: El Pais de Las Maravillas (World Village)
 2013: New Day (Harmonia Mundi)
 2015: Havana – Paris – Dakar (World Village)
 2016: El Viaje (Mack Avenue Records)
 2018: Un Dia Cualquiera (Mack Avenue Records)
 2020: Te Lo Dije (Mack Avenue Records)

References 

Cuban contemporary artists
Cuban jazz musicians
Cuban songwriters
Male songwriters
Afro-Cuban jazz pianists
Cuban jazz pianists
Cuban jazz composers
Living people
1983 births
Male pianists
21st-century pianists
Male jazz composers
21st-century male musicians
Mack Avenue Records artists
Harmonia Mundi artists